The following outline is provided as an overview of and topical guide to Rivers State:

Rivers State – one of the 36 states of Nigeria, located in the southernmost part of the country. The state has a population of more than 5 million, and is the sixth-most populous state according to census data released in 2006. Its capital, Port Harcourt is the largest city, and is economically significant as the centre of Nigeria's oil industry.

General reference
 Names
 Common name: Rivers State
 Local name: Rivers
 Pronunciation:
 Official name: Rivers State
 Nicknames
 Treasure Base of the Nation
 Adjectivals
 Riverian
 Demonyms
 Riverian
 Abbreviations and name codes
 ISO 3166-2 code:  NG-RI
 Vehicle registration code: 
 Rankings
 by population: 5th
 by area (2006 census): 26th
 by crime rate: 
 by gross domestic product (GDP) (2010): 2nd
 by Human Development Index (HDI):
 by life expectancy at birth: 
 by literacy rate: 3rd

Geography of Rivers State
Geography of Rivers State
 Rivers State is: a Nigerian state, and one of the 36 states of the Federal Republic of Nigeria
 Location
 Northern Hemisphere
 Eastern Hemisphere
 Africa
 Sub-Saharan Africa
 West Africa
 Nigeria
 Southern Nigeria
 Time zone: West Africa Time (UTC+01)

Environment of Rivers State 
 Climate of Rivers State
 Renewable energy in Rivers State
 Protected areas of Rivers State
Biseni Forest
Finima Nature Park
Upper Orashi Forest
 Wildlife of Rivers State
 Fauna of Rivers State
 Birds of Rivers State
 Mammals of Rivers State

Natural geographic features of Rivers State 
 Lakes of Rivers State
 Rivers of Rivers State

Regions of Rivers State

Administrative divisions of Rivers State

Local government areas of Rivers State 
 Abua–Odual
 Ahoada East
 Ahoada West
 Akuku-Toru
 Andoni
 Asari-Toru
 Bonny
 Degema
 Eleme
 Emohua
 Etche
 Gokana
 Ikwerre
 Khana
 Obio-Akpor
 Ogba–Egbema–Ndoni
 Ogu–Bolo
 Okrika
 Omuma
 Opobo–Nkoro
 Oyigbo
 Port Harcourt
 Tai

Government and politics of Rivers State 

Politics of Rivers State
 Form of government: Presidential republic
 Capital of Rivers State: Port Harcourt
 Government House, Port Harcourt
 Elections in Rivers State

Branches of the government of Rivers State 

Government of Rivers State

Executive branch of the government of Rivers State 
 Governor of Rivers State
 Deputy Governor of Rivers State
 Executive Council of Rivers State
 State ministries
 Rivers State Ministry of Transport
 Rivers State Ministry of Energy and Natural Resources

Legislative branch of the government of Rivers State 

 Rivers State House of Assembly (unicameral)
 Speaker of the House

Judicial branch of the government of Rivers State 
Courts of Rivers State
 High Court of Rivers State
 Rivers State Customary Court of Appeal

Law and order in Rivers State 
 Crime in Rivers State
 Rivers State Police

History of Rivers State
History of Rivers State

Culture of Rivers State
Culture of Rivers State
List of people from Rivers State

Economy and infrastructure of Rivers State
Economy of Rivers State
Agriculture in Rivers State
 Communications in Rivers State
 Newspapers in Rivers State
 Radio stations in Rivers State
 Television stations in Rivers State
 Health care in Rivers State
 Hospitals in Rivers State
 Transportation in Rivers State
 Airports in Rivers State
 Roads in Rivers State
 Highways in Rivers State

Education in Rivers State
 Rivers State Ministry of Education
 Schools in Rivers State
 List of schools in Rivers State
 Higher education in Rivers State
 Catholic Institute of West Africa
 Rivers State College of Health Science and Technology
 Eastern Polytechnic, Port Harcourt
 Ignatius Ajuru University of Education
 Port Harcourt Polytechnic
 Rivers State University
 University of Port Harcourt

See also

Topic overview:
Rivers State

Index of Rivers State-related articles
Bibliography of Rivers State

References

External links 

Rivers State
Rivers State
 1